Jan Hernych, who was the defending champion, chose to not compete this year.
Michael Berrer won in the final 6–7(6), 6–4, 7–6(3), against Dominik Hrbatý.

Seeds

Draw

Finals

Top half

Bottom half

References
 Main Draw
 Qualifying Draw

Ritro Slovak Open - Singles
2009 Singles